"Don't Speak" is a song by American rock band No Doubt from their third studio album, Tragic Kingdom (1995). It was released as the third single from Tragic Kingdom in the United States on April 15, 1996, by Interscope Records. Lead singer Gwen Stefani and her brother Eric Stefani, former No Doubt member, wrote the song originally as a love song. The song went through several rewrites and new versions. Gwen modified it into a breakup song about her bandmate and ex-boyfriend Tony Kanal, shortly after he ended their seven-year relationship.

Despite the song's popularity and substantial airplay, "Don't Speak" did not chart on the US Billboard Hot 100 (as rules of the times required commercial singles for charting and one was not issued for the song), but it did reach number one on the Hot 100 Airplay chart for 16 weeks. Outside the United States, it topped the charts in Australia, Canada, Iceland, the Netherlands, New Zealand, the Republic of Ireland and the United Kingdom, becoming No Doubt's most successful international single. "Don't Speak" was nominated for Song of the Year and Best Pop Performance by a Duo or Group with Vocals at the 40th Grammy Awards.

"Don't Speak" was ranked at number 495 on Blender magazine's "The 500 Greatest Songs Since You Were Born". The song is a playable track in the 2009 video game Band Hero, and is also included as a downloadable song in 2008's Rock Band 2, as well as part of the No Doubt Track Pack for Guitar Hero III. The song has been sampled by multiple hip hop artists, including in Rakim's song "Dedicated" and Ice Cube's "War & Peace".

Background and composition
"Don't Speak" is an alternative rock power ballad written by lead singer Gwen Stefani and her brother Eric Stefani, and produced by Matthew Wilder. Originally a love song, Stefani rewrote the lyrics almost completely after her breakup with the band's bass player Tony Kanal. According to her, "It used to be more upbeat, more of a Seventies rock-type thing. [When] Tony and I broke up... it turned into a sad song." A live version that exists from April 1994 shows off a bouncy tune that has the same skeleton as the released version, but not the same urgency. The band performed part of the original song on VH1 Storytellers on August 10, 2000.

The band's lead guitarist Tom Dumont said about the song's composition:  There's a lot of stories about that song, because that one unfolded over a longer period of time. Originally, Gwen's brother wrote most of that song, and then after we got at it as a band, Gwen changed the lyrics around to fit her life. Musically, we brought it to another level, but near the end we reworded it. There's an earlier version of the song where the verses are totally different, which is a really beautiful version and it's awesome but it's way more jazzy and really different. That song had a long incubation process.

"Don't Speak" is composed in the key of C minor with the chorus in F minor. A demo version also appeared on a demo CD, which was presented to Interscope Records prior to the release of Tragic Kingdom.

Critical reception
British magazine Music Week rated the song three out of five, writing that "this Californian quartet sound more like Swedish Eurovision hopefuls on this debut UK offering but, if radio bites, it could be a smash."

Chart performance
Upon release, "Don't Speak" immediately began to receive extensive airplay and it eventually became the most widely played song on American radio in 1996. It reached number one on Billboard's Hot 100 Airplay chart and maintained that position for 16 non-consecutive weeks, a record at the time. Despite its copious airplay, "Don't Speak" was not allowed to chart on the Billboard Hot 100 since no commercial single was released for it in the United States (a requirement for charting purposes at the time). Slate magazine music critic Chris Molanphy has stated that if the song had been eligible to chart, it almost certainly would have claimed the number one spot. An import CD did sell in the US, but this format was not allowed to chart either.

On other Billboard charts, "Don't Speak" stayed at number two on Alternative Airplay chart for five consecutive weeks, blocked by the band Bush's single "Swallowed". The song also proved to be a crossover hit, reaching number one on the Adult Top 40 chart for 15 consecutive weeks as well as numbers six and nine on the Adult Contemporary and Rhythmic charts, respectively. It was ultimately placed at number one on the Hot 100 Airplay year-end chart of 1997.
 
Internationally, "Don't Speak" was also very successful. In February 1997, it peaked at number one in both the United Kingdom and Ireland for three weeks. Elsewhere in Europe, "Don't Speak" reached the top position in Belgium, the Netherlands, Norway, Sweden and Switzerland. Australia was another major music market where the song received widespread airplay, debuting at number one and maintaining the peak position for eight weeks.

Music video
The video was directed by Sophie Muller and it is the first of the long-time collaboration between the band and the director. Before the music starts, at the beginning of the music video, there is a scene of Kanal picking a rotten orange from a tree (these scenes are usually cut out when VH1 airs this video). The majority of the video for "Don't Speak" takes place on Stage 2 at Mack Sennett Studios in Silver Lake as the band plays. Other scenes tell the story of how the media mainly focused on Stefani while the band was always in the background. The second half of the video features snippets of live footage filmed during the band's performance with Dog Eat Dog and Goldfinger at the Roseland Ballroom in New York City on August 21, 1996. The video also features a short footage showing Dumont playing together with Foo Fighters's guitarist Pat Smear. The video ends with Kanal replacing the orange in the tree, which is actually footage of Kanal in reverse pulling the orange off.

Tensions in the band had been running high and they reportedly were on the verge of breaking up the day before they were scheduled to film the video. They decided to go ahead and film it as a form of "therapy".

The video won the award for Best Group Video and was nominated for Video of the Year at the 1997 MTV Video Music Awards. It has over 876 million views on YouTube as of February 2022, and 700 million of the views come from 2016, 2017, 2018 and 2019 alone. The video, now remastered in 4K, was uploaded on October 7, 2009.

There is an alternate video version of the video showing just the live performance part. Both versions of the video are included on the DVD release The Videos 1992–2003 (2004).

Track listing and formats
UK, European CD single
UK cassette single
"Don't Speak" – 4:23
"Greener Pastures" (from The Beacon Street Collection album) – 5:05

UK, European, Australian and Japanese CD maxi single
"Don't Speak" – 4:23
"Don't Speak" (Alternate Version) – 4:23 (*)
"Hey You" (Acoustic Version) – 3:25 (*)
"Greener Pastures" (from The Beacon Street Collection album) – 5:05

(*) Recorded at York Street Studios, Auckland, New Zealand, September 1996.

UK limited 7-inch vinyl single
A. "Don't Speak" – 4:23
B. "Greener Pastures" – 5:05

Charts

Weekly charts

Year-end charts

All-time chart

Certifications and sales

Release history

Cover versions
Niamh Perry covered the song during her time on I'd Do Anything in 2008.
In 2012, it was covered by various members of the Glee cast for the episode "The Break Up" before subsequently being released as a single on iTunes. 
Leela James covered "Don't Speak" on her album A Change Is Gonna Come.
In 2013, Jiordan Tolli performed the song on the fifth season of The X Factor Australia during week six. Her performance gained positive feedback from the judges.
Carly Rae Jepsen released a cover of the song recorded live at Electric Lady Studios in New York City as one of her Spotify Singles.
In October 2020, Stefani performed a "countrified version" of Don't Speak as part of a skit on The Tonight Show Starring Jimmy Fallon where Fallon portrayed the character Buck Pinto promoting a fictitious album Gwen's Gone Country.
In 2022, Japanese rock band Coldrain released a cover of "Don't Speak" on their seventh studio album Nonnegative.

Notes

References
 [ Allmusic]. Accessed October 28, 2010.
 Official No Doubt Website. Accessed October 28, 2010.
 .
 Swiss Charts. Accessed October 28, 2010.

External links
 .

1990s ballads
1996 singles
1996 songs
Dutch Top 40 number-one singles
European Hot 100 Singles number-one singles
Interscope Records singles
Irish Singles Chart number-one singles
Music videos directed by Sophie Muller
No Doubt songs
Number-one singles in Australia
Number-one singles in Denmark
Number-one singles in Hungary
Number-one singles in Iceland
Number-one singles in New Zealand
Number-one singles in Norway
Number-one singles in Romania
Number-one singles in Scotland
Number-one singles in Sweden
Number-one singles in Switzerland
RPM Top Singles number-one singles
Song recordings produced by Matthew Wilder
Songs about heartache
Songs written by Eric Stefani
Songs written by Gwen Stefani
UK Singles Chart number-one singles
Ultratop 50 Singles (Flanders) number-one singles
Alternative rock ballads